NBC 25 may refer to one of the following television stations in the United States:

Current
KAVU-DT2 in Victoria, Texas
Local simulcast of KMOL-LD
KNDU in Richland/Pasco/Kennewick, Washington
Semi-satellite of KNDO in Yakima, Washington
WEEK-TV in Peoria, Illinois
WEYI-TV in Saginaw/Flint, Michigan
WXXV-DT2 in Biloxi/Gulfport, Mississippi

Former
KAVU-TV in Victoria, Texas (1982 to 1994)
KXXV in Waco/Temple, Texas (1985)
WCOS-TV (now WOLO-TV) in Columbia, South Carolina (1953)
WHAG-TV (now WDVM-TV) in Hagerstown, Maryland (1970 to 2016)
WJTV in Jackson Mississippi (1953; now on channel 12)